The following is an alphabetical list of members of the United States House of Representatives from the state of Tennessee.  For chronological tables of members of both houses of the United States Congress from the state (through the present day), see United States congressional delegations from Tennessee.

Current representatives 

 : Diana Harshbarger (R) (since 2021)
 : Tim Burchett (R) (since 2019)
 : Chuck Fleischmann (R) (since 2011)
 : Scott DesJarlais (R) (since 2011)
 : Andy Ogles (R) (since 2023)
 : John Rose (R) (since 2019)
 : Mark E. Green (R) (since 2019)
 : David Kustoff (R) (since 2017)
 : Steve Cohen (D) (since 2007)

List of members

See also

List of United States senators from Tennessee
United States congressional delegations from Tennessee
Tennessee's congressional districts

 
Tennessee
United States rep